Dimitrios "James" Stamopoulos (born 24 June 1991) is a Canadian professional soccer player who plays as a left back for Greek Super League 2 club Anagennisi Karditsa.

Career

Early years 
Born in Toronto, Ontario, Canada to Greek parents, Stamopoulos began playing football at the age of four with Dixie FC. He played for Erin Mills Soccer Club in the Ontario Youth Soccer League, where he achieved top goal scorer honours. He won the Ontario Cup and National Club Championship in 2005. Stamopoulos attended the Port Credit Secondary School, where he was a three-year member of the varsity soccer team. He captained the high school team during his sophomore and junior seasons and was named the team's most valuable player after leading the team in scoring for three-straight seasons. As a sophomore, he won the Tier 2 ROPSSAA high school league, and was called-up to the Canadian U-16 National Team in 2007. At the age of 17, he joined the Toronto FC Academy, and played in the Canadian Soccer League. He came close to signing with the first team, but instead chose to move to the United States on a scholarship and attend the University of Hartford to pursue a degree in marketing.

Hartford Hawks
During his freshman year at Hartford, Stamopoulos played in all 18 games with the Hawks, scoring one goal and leading the team in assists (4). He was named to the America East All-Rookie Team. As a sophomore, Stamopoulos missed six games due to an injury. After making his return to the line-up, Hartford rebounded from an 0-5 start to post a mark of 5-4. He played in nine games total, eight of which as a starter, and scored three goals. As a result, he was named to the America East All-Academic Team. During his four seasons with the Hawks, Stamopoulos started in 59 of the 62 games he played in. As a four-year midfielder, he scored seven goals and delivered eight assists, while also netting three game-winning goals.

Senior career 
After he received his degree from Hartford, Stamopoulos pursued a professional football career. In 2013, he returned to the Canadian Soccer League, and played with Burlington SC. Due to his dual nationality, Stamopoulos moved to Greece, where he was tried by Second Division sides Fokikos and Kallithea. Having convinced Kallithea staff of his talent but missing the transfer window, Stamopoulos ended up signing a three-month contract with East Attica regional division club Proteas Paleas Fokeas. During the winter transfer window of 2015, Stamopoulos finally moved to Kallithea, where he stayed until the summer of 2017. He made his league debut for the club on 11 January 2015, at the Athens Olympic Stadium against renowned Greek club AEK, coming in as a second half substitute. He played in 52 league games scoring three goals. After Kallithea, Stamopoulos moved to Crete, signing with fellow second-tier side Ergotelis, and rejoining with former Kallithea coach Takis Gonias. 

In 2021, he sighed with Anagennisi Karditsa.

Club statistics

References

External links
 

1991 births
Living people
Canadian people of Greek descent
Canadian soccer players
Canadian expatriate soccer players
Toronto FC players
Halton United players
Kallithea F.C. players
Ergotelis F.C. players
Panachaiki F.C. players
Anagennisi Karditsa F.C. players
Association football fullbacks
Canadian Soccer League (1998–present) players
Football League (Greece) players
Super League Greece 2 players
Canadian expatriate sportspeople in Greece
Expatriate footballers in Greece
Soccer players from Toronto